Ilya Vladimirovich Prusikin (born 8 April 1985), is a Russian musician, singer, record producer, vlogger, video director and screenwriter. He is best known as the front person and founder of Saint Petersburg punk-pop-rave group Little Big. He is also known under the stage name Ilich, an in-joke referencing Vladimir Lenin's patronymic and Oblomov character.

Life and career 
Ilya Prusikin was born in Siberia, in the village of Ust'-Borzya, Chita Oblast (now Zabaykalsky Krai). In his early infancy, he moved to Sosnovy Bor, situated in Leningrad Oblast, with his parents. He studied piano at a local children's musical school. Prusikin later graduated from Saint-Petersburg State University of Culture and Arts with a degree in psychology.

In 2011, he started a collaboration with a subsidiary project of the Russian fun-production studio "My Ducks Vision" by Yuri Degtyarev named "Thank you, Eva!", uniting video bloggers into one large affiliate network, and in 2012 he directed "Guffy Gough Show" (2012) and "The Great Rap Battle" (2012). Both of his programs went on to become the network's highest-rated videos. Also in 2012, Prusikin produced and directed the Internet sitcom "Police Weekdays" (Russian: «Полицейские будни»). After three episodes, the show was cancelled indefinitely.

In 2013, Prusikin and Eldar Dzharakhov founded the artistic partnership “ClickKlak”. According to them, the audience of ClickKlack consists of "boys and girls with an active lifestyle and a good sense of humour". The channel's page contains such shows as “Give the Bream” (Russian: «Дай леща»), “Thrash Lotto” (Russian: «Трэш лото»), “As You Say” (Russian: «Как скажешь»), “Shocking Karaoke” (Russian: «Шокирующее караоке»), “Experiments' Destroyers” (Russian: «Разрушители экспериментов»), “Kick the Bucket” (Russian: «Сыграл в ящик»), etc.

Musical career 

In 2003, Ilyich became a member of nu-metal band Tenkorr. Prusikin also gained experience working with the other groups, Like A Virgin, St. Bastards and Construktorr among them. Ilya has since achieved greater domestic and international recognition with the band Little Big, founded on April 1, 2013. All music videos of the band are shot by its co-founder, Alina Pasok (Russian: Алина Пязок).

Personal life 
On July 6, 2016, Ilya Prusikin married musician Irina Smelaya, better known by her stage name Tatarka. Their son Dobrynya was born on November 26, 2017.

On August 21, 2020 Smelaya and Prusikin announced their separation on YouTube.

Political views 
In 2018, Prusikin quoted the famous aphorism: "The [Russian] state has murdered my Motherland" and criticised the Russian populace's easygoing attitude towards life and, especially, local indifference towards corruption.
In a 2019 interview with Xenia Sobchak, Prusikin spoke of his total dislike of modern Russian politics, emphasising the increased "cult of intolerance and anger" in internal politics after 2012. He publicly supported Ivan Golunov during the journalist's persecution.

In 2022 after the Russian inviasion of Ukraine, Ilya stated "We adore our country, but we completely disagree with the war in Ukraine, moreover, we believe that any war is unacceptable." He also announced that he had left the country and relocated to Los Angeles with the singer Sonya, stating that "we are so disgusted by the Russian military propaganda machine that we decided to drop everything and leave the country." Later on 23 June 2022 he (as Little Big) released the single Generation Cancellation.

References

External links 
 

Russian YouTubers
Russian record producers
21st-century Russian male singers
21st-century Russian singers
Living people
1985 births
English-language singers from Russia
Russian activists against the 2022 Russian invasion of Ukraine
People from Ononsky District
Music YouTubers